Thanatus formicinus is a species of spider in the family Philodromidae. It has a Holarctic distribution.

References

Philodromidae
Holarctic spiders
Spiders described in 1757
Taxa named by Carl Alexander Clerck